Blue Denim is a 1959 film based on a Broadway play by writer James Leo Herlihy. It starred Carol Lynley and Warren Berlinger who reprised their stage roles. 17-year-old Brandon deWilde appeared in his first "adult" role as the male lead Arthur Bartley. Macdonald Carey, Marsha Hunt and Roberta Shore appear as supporting characters.

Dealing with the issues of teenage pregnancy and (then-illegal) abortion, both versions were not without controversy.

Plot
The story is set in Dearborn, Michigan during the 1950s, and revolves around 14-year-old Arthur Bartley (Brandon deWilde) and his schoolmates, 15-year-old Janet Willard (Carol Lynley) and Ernie (Warren Berlinger). While widower's-daughter Janet laughs at Arthur and Ernie's forays into smoking, drinking, and playing cards, she has always been interested in Arthur. As Arthur's parents try to shelter him from negative things in life (like the euthanasia of the family dog, done while he is at school), he turns to Janet for comfort.

The relationship between Janet and Arthur results in her becoming pregnant. Unable to ask their parents (who misinterpret their pleas as "ordinary" teenage curiosity about sex and adulthood) for help, they turn to Ernie, who had boasted earlier about "helping a sailor who got his girl in trouble" by directing him to an abortionist – only to discover Ernie made it all up, based on secondhand stories. The three seek together to arrange an abortion and raise the funds, only to be discovered by their parents at the last moment. In the meantime, Arthur and Janet find out how much they do not yet know about life – and how much they truly care about each other.

Cast
 Carol Lynley as Janet Willard
 Brandon deWilde as Arthur Bartley
 Macdonald Carey as Maj. Malcolm Bartley, Ret.
 Marsha Hunt as Jessie Bartley
 Warren Berlinger as Ernie
 Buck Class as Axel Sorenson
 Nina Shipman as Lillian Bartley
 Vaughn Taylor as Professor Willard
 Roberta Shore as Cherie
 Mary Young as Aunt Bidda
 Malcolm Atterbury as Marriage License Clerk (uncredited)
 William Schallert as George – Bank Vice President (uncredited)

Original play
The play was first announced in 1955. In December 1955, its title was changed to The Children's Comedy. In June 1957 the title was changed back to Blue Denim. Joshua Logan agreed to direct.

Carol Lynley was cast in the lead. Warren Berlinger joined the cast several months later. Newcomer Burt Brinckerhoff was the lead male role.

The play opened February 27, 1958 at the Playhouse Theatre. The New York Times called it "a moving play". It closed after 166 performances.

Filming production
Film rights were bought by 20th Century Fox.  In August 1958, Fox announced that the leads would be played by Carol Lynley and Ray Stricklyn. In September Lynley was signed to a long-term contract at Fox and Dick Powell was to produce and direct.

In October 1958, Fox assigned Phillip Dunne to write and direct the film. Dunne wrote the script in collaboration with Edith Sommer, who just had a play on Broadway about teenagers titled A Roomful of Roses, which producer Charles Brackett had admired.

Eventually Stricklyn dropped out and the lead was played by Brandon de Wilde. Filming started May 23, 1959.

Differences between stage and film versions
The play and the film had different endings, and the word abortion in the play was not used in the screenplay.

In the original stage version, Janet does have her fetus aborted, and she and Arthur talk it over later as they settle their feelings for each other. When the play was adapted for Hollywood, however, strict production codes forbade anything but the condemnation of abortion, so the storyline was changed. Arthur and Janet instead get married and stay with Janet's aunt in another city until the baby is born.

Release
The film was released on July 30, 1959 by 20th Century Fox at the Victoria Theatre in New York City.

Home media
20th Century Fox released Blue Denim on DVD on March 16, 2016. Twilight Time released the film on Blu-ray disc on April 10, 2018. It plays occasionally on cable TV and video on demand.

Critical and public reception
According to Dunne, the film was a financial, if not critical, success. In its first week of release in New York it grossed $39,500.

Music
The film score for Blue Denim was composed and conducted by Bernard Herrmann. It has been described by Film Score Monthly as a "Baby Vertigo type of score, reminiscent of Herrmann's anguished romantic writing for Hitchcock". The score was released on CD in November 2001.

In other media
 In Truman Capote's book In Cold Blood (1966), Bobby Rupp, Nancy Clutter's beau, says "We talked for a while, and made a date to go to the movies Sunday night – a picture all the girls were looking forward to, Blue Denim."
 It is seen briefly in Less than Zero (when Clay and Blair are in bed in the loft).

See also
 List of American films of 1959

References

External links
 
 
 
 
Review of play at Variety

1958 plays
1959 films
1950s teen drama films
American teen drama films
American black-and-white films
Films scored by Bernard Herrmann
American films based on plays
Films directed by Philip Dunne
Films produced by Charles Brackett
Films set in Michigan
Plays by James Leo Herlihy
Films with screenplays by Philip Dunne
Teenage pregnancy in film
Films about abortion
1959 drama films
CinemaScope films
1950s English-language films
1950s American films